Campanulariidae is a family of animals in the phylum Cnidaria, or stinging-celled animals. Campanulariidae is composed entirely of hydroids, a Greek term meaning "water animals" applied to the plant-like polyp colonies of the class Hydrozoa. All species of the Campanulariidae are aquatic in habitat, primarily inhabiting coastal regions and tidal pools.

Obelia contains probably the most well-known species of this phylum, and include four species. All are around 20–35 cm in height with a series of branches carrying the individual polyps. One species, Obelia longissima, is unique for its ability to produce obelin, a photoprotein which allows for bioluminescence.

The genus Laomedea includes such species as Laomedea angulata and Laomedea flexuosa, which are similar in appearance to the Obelia, though they are smaller and lack a medusa stage present in Obelia.

Taxonomy and systematics
The following genera are classified in the family Campanulariidae:
 Campanularia 
 Clytia 
 Gastroblasta
 Gonothyraea
 Hartlaubella
 Laomedea
 Obelia
 Orthopyxis
 Rhizocaulus
 Silicularia
 Zelounies (nomen nudum)

See also
Clytia gregaria

Footnotes

References
  (2008): Campanulariidae. Retrieved 2008-JUL-08.

 
Leptothecata
Cnidarian families